Gillian Hiscott is an author and playwright, born in Plymouth, Devon, United Kingdom, in 1959 whose plays have been performed both in London and at the Edinburgh Festival. Her work in the theatre has been largely to promote the work of British female writers and she is the only published adaptor of work by Marie Corelli. Her last two plays were written whilst completing an MA in Playwriting and Script Development at Exeter University and are examples of plays affected by the literary concept known as the stream of consciousness. Her only novel Lady in Chains is WW2 fiction and centres on an era of social history which reflects a changing way of life for the British aristocracy.

Performing in more than one of the author's plays is veteran actress Beryl Nesbitt, LTDB entry who has featured in many film and TV roles. Involved in Vendetta as performers and directors: Christopher Gutmann, Ralph Mondi, Laurie Hagen.

Published plays 

1995 Adaptation Emily Brontë's Wuthering Heights, Cressrelles 
2007 Adaptation Jane Austen's "Mansfield Park" Jasper  Staged at Upstairs at the Gatehouse. LTDB entry
2007 Adaptation Marie Corelli's "Vendetta", 2006, Jasper  - Staged at the Edinburgh Festival.
2009 "The Young Diana" Jasper 
2009 "Love in Vain in Vain" Jasper

Novel 
 2004 Lady in Chains 
 2011 Alentejo Magic

Poetry 
1992 Morning Listed in Winter Words

Play reviews 
ThreeWeeks 19 May 2006
The Bath Chronicle 16 May 2006 "Vendetta" at Bath Fringe Festival
The Bath Chronicle 2 June 2006 page 21 Philip Horton
Metro August 2006
ThreeWeeks 8 August 2006
The Scotsman 16 August 2006 Andrea Mullaney Edition : Festival Page number: 14
The Stage 18 August 2006
Metro 17 July 2007
Time Out London 23 July 2007
Camden New Journal 19 July 2007
Ham & High 19 July 2007 Theatre page X11 Aline Waites

References

Articles on 
Western Evening Herald 29 May 2006 Page 19 - article by Hannah Wood
Western Evening Herald 7 March 2009 - article by Martin Freeman
The Voice of Plymouth Edition Page 6

1959 births
Living people
English dramatists and playwrights
English women dramatists and playwrights
Writers from Plymouth, Devon